Tähtivaeltaja Award is an annual prize by Helsingin science fiction seura ry for the best science fiction book released in Finnish.

The winners

2016 

Margaret Atwood: Uusi maa (MaddAddam, Otava)

Shortlisted books:

Emmi Itäranta: Kudottujen kujien kaupunki (The City of Woven Streets, Teos)
Ursula K. Le Guin: Haikaran silmä (The Eye of the Heron, Vaskikirjat)
Jeff VanderMeer: Hävitys (Annihilation, Like)
Gene Wolfe: Liktorin miekka (The Sword of the Lictor, Gummerus)

2015 

Antti Salminen: Lomonosovin moottori (Poesia)

Shortlisted books:

Petri Laine & Anne Leinonen: Kuulen laulun kaukaisen (Kuoriaiskirjat, short story collection)
Thomas Pynchon: Painovoiman sateenkaari (Gravity's Rainbow, Teos)
Alastair Reynolds: Terästuulen yllä (On the Steel Breeze, Like)
Jani Saxell: Sotilasrajan unet (WSOY)

2014 

Peter Watts: Sokeanäkö (Blindsight, Gummerus)

Shortlisted books:

Iain Banks: Siirtymä (Transition, Gummerus)
Lauren Beukes: Säkenöivät tytöt (The Shining Girls, S&S)
Hugh Howey: Siilo (Silo, Like)
Johanna Sinisalo: Auringon ydin (Teos)

2013 

Gene Wolfe: Kiduttajan varjo (The Shadow of the Torturer, Gummerus)

Shortlisted books:

 Emmi Itäranta: Teemestarin kirja (Teos)
 Ernest Cline: Ready Player One (Gummerus) 
 Alastair Reynolds: Pääteasema (Terminal World, Like)
 Alastair Reynolds: Muistoissa sininen maa (Blue Remembered Earth, Like)

2012 

Hannu Rajaniemi: Kvanttivaras (Tammi)

Shortlisted books:

 Eija Lappalainen & Anne Leinonen: Routasisarukset (WSOY)
 China Miéville: Toiset (The City & the City, Karisto) 
 Alastair Reynolds: Pääteasema (Terminal World, Like)
 Johanna Sinisalo: Enkelten verta (Teos)

2011 

Maarit Verronen: Kirkkaan selkeää (Tammi)

Shortlisted books:

 Margaret Atwood: Herran tarhurit (The Year of the Flood, Otava)
 Pat Cadigan: Mielenpeli (Mindplayers, Avain) 
 Philip K. Dick: Tohtori Veriraha (Dr. Bloodmoney, Like)
 Hal Duncan: Muste (Ink, Like) 
 Maarit Verronen: Kirkkaan selkeää (Tammi)

2010 

Hal Duncan: Vellum (Like)

Other shortlisted books:

 Charlotte Perkins Gilman: Herland (Savukeidas)
 Teemu Kaskinen: Sinulle, yö (WSOY)
 Ursula K. Le Guin: Kahdesti haarautuva puu (BTJ)
 Michael Moorcock: Katso ihmistä! (Vaskikirjat)

2009 

Cormac McCarthy: Tie (WSOY)

Other shortlisted books:

 M. John Harrison: Nova Swing (Like) 
 Viivi Hyvönen: Apina ja Uusikuu (WSOY)
 David Mitchell: Pilvikartasto (Sammakko)
 Maarit Verronen: Karsintavaihe (Tammi)

2008 

Richard Matheson: Olen legenda (Vaskikirjat)

Other shortlisted books:

 Steven Hall: Haiteksti (WSOY)
 J. Pekka Mäkelä: Nedut (Like)
 M. G. Soikkeli: Marsin ikävä ja muita kertomuksia (Turbator, short story collection)
 Howard Waldrop: Musiikkia miesäänille ja lentäville lautasille (Kirjava, short story collection)

2007 

Stepan Chapman: Troikka (The Tree Club)

Other shortlisted books:

 Steve Aylett: Atomi (Like)
 Benoît Duteurtre: Tyttö ja tupakka (Like)
 Michel Houellebecq: Mahdollinen saari (WSOY)
 J. Pekka Mäkelä: Alshain (Like)

2006 

 Risto Isomäki: Sarasvatin hiekkaa (Tammi)

Other shortlisted books:

 Ursula K. Le Guin: Pimeälipas ja muita kertomuksia (Kirjava, short story collection)
 Alastair Reynolds: Timanttikoirat, turkoosit päivät (Like, two novellas)
 Philip Roth: Salajuoni Amerikkaa vastaan (WSOY)
 Johanna Sinisalo: Kädettömät kuninkaat ja muita häiritseviä tarinoita (Teos, short story collection)

2005 

 M. John Harrison: Valo (Like)

Other shortlisted books:

 Iain M. Banks: Tähystä tuulenpuolta (Loki-kirjat)
 Simon Ings: Rautakalan kaupunki (Loki-kirjat)
 Mikael Niemi: Nahkakolo (Tammi)
 Tero Niemi and Anne Salminen: Nimbus ja tähdet (Atena)

Previous awards 

 2004: J. G. Ballard: Super-Cannes (Super-Cannes)
 2003: Ray Loriga: Tokio ei välitä meistä enää (Tokio ya no nos quiere)
 2002: Jonathan Lethem: Musiikkiuutisia (Gun, with Occasional Music)
 2001: Pasi Ilmari Jääskeläinen: Missä junat kääntyvät (short story collection)
 2000: Will Self: Suuret apinat (Great Apes)
 1999: Stefano Benni: Baol
 1998: Dan Simmons: Hyperion (Hyperion)
 1997: Theodore Roszak: Flicker (Flicker)
 1996: Mary Rosenblum: Harhainvalta 
 1995: Iain M. Banks: Pelaaja (The Player of Games)
 1994: Simon Ings: Kuuma pää (Headlong)
 1993: Philip K. Dick: Oraakkelin kirja (The Man in the High Castle)
 1992: William Gibson: Neurovelho (Neuromancer)
 1991: Philip K. Dick: Hämärän vartija (A Scanner Darkly)
 1990: Brian Aldiss: Helliconia-trilogia (Helliconia Trilogy)
 1989: Flann O'Brien: Kolmas konstaapeli (The Third Policeman)
 1988: Greg Bear: Veren musiikkia (Blood Music)
 1987: Joanna Russ: Naisten planeetta (The Female Man)
 1986: Cordwainer Smith: Planeetta nimeltä Shajol (The Best of Cordwainer Smith, short story collection)

See also 
 Tähtifantasia Award

Science fiction awards
Finnish literary awards
Finnish speculative fiction awards